Displaced Persons is a 1985 Australian TV movie about refugees arriving in Australia in 1945.

It was the first script written by Louis Nowra, who was inspired by a book he read about displaced people in Australia after World War Two. He wrote it in three days and sent it to the ABC who agreed to make it.

The movie was well received and Nowra went on to write a number of works for the ABC.

References

External links

1985 television films
1985 films
Australian television films